Koala Motel is the fourth album by Australian alternative country musician Anne McCue. It was released in 2006 by Messenger Records.

Track listing
All tracks composed by Anne McCue; except where noted.
 "Driving Down Alvarado" (A.McCue, J.Robin)	
 "From Bakersfield to Saigon" 	
 "Bright Light of Day" 	
 "Hellfire Raiser"	
 "Sweet Burden of Youth"	
 "Coming to You"	
 "Any Minute Now" (A.McCue D.Raven, M.McCue)	
 "Jesus' Blood"
 "Shivers"	
 "As The Crow Flies" (T.J. White) 	
 "Lay Me Down"	
 "Koala Motel" (A.McCue, M.McCue)

2006 albums
Anne McCue albums
Messenger Records albums